The St Kilda Sea Baths is a pool, spa, food and entertainment complex on St Kilda Beach, Victoria, Australia. Numerous 'seabath' structures have come and gone on the St Kilda foreshore, the last built in a Spanish- Moorish style in 1931, which was demolished in the 1990s and replaced by the present structure, partly reconstructing the 1931 baths.

History

Until the 1850s, 'open' sea bathing, in the open sea, was not generally considered acceptable. It was, however, permitted within large timber structures as protection from predatory marine life and away from public view. The first formal St Kilda Sea Baths were opened in 1860 and provided separate sections for men and women.

By the mid 1920s, increasing numbers of people were bathing in the open sea. By 1928 men and women were mingling freely in the water and St Kilda Council erected three open-sea changing pavilions along its foreshore: at West St Kilda, on Beaconsfield Parade, at St Kilda Beach (at 40 Jacka Boulevard) and at Elwood (Ormond Esplanade, demolished in 1971).  The beach pavilions proved more popular than the sea baths.

This design incorporates a reconstruction of the twin-domed Moorish-style section, and a plainer section adjacent occupying the footprint of the former baths. The complex includes numerous restaurants on two levels, function rooms, a courtyard between the Moorish domes, a health club, and a 25m public swimming pool, Australia's only indoor heated sea-water pool.

In 2017 a new controversy erupted when the leasee of the function rooms and the rooftop proposed to add a larger rooftop pavilion.

Land ownership
The land on which the Sea Baths were built has remained Crown Land, managed by the Department of Lands and its successors (in 2018 this is the Department of Environment, Land, Water and Planning), in consultation with the local Council, currently the City of Port Phillip. Council has not always agreed with the decisions of the Department. The complex is leased to an operator, who sub-lets the various tenancies. The pool, gym and spa have been leased since 2001 by South Pacific Health Clubs.

References

Further reading
 Lynn, Elwyn, Sidney Nolan - Australia.  Bay Books.  Sydney & London 1979. . pp46 & 47. 
 Emerald Hill Times - The Melbourne Weekly.  16–22 February 2000
 Kelly, Jan. ‘Still not making a splash’.  Herald Sun.  15 October 2001.  p23.
 Kelly, Jan. ‘Opening sinks delay claims’.  Herald Sun.  16 October 2001.
 Kenneth, Joachim. ‘Skinny Dipping in Style’. The Herald.  26 April 1980.
 Kerrick, Jane.  Surf still not up at sea baths.  Port Philip/ Caulfield Leader.  28 May 2000.
 National Trust of Australia (Victoria). File No 4903.
 Robert Peck von Hartel Trethowan. City of St Kilda Twentieth Century Architectural Study.  May 1992.  Vol.3.
 Splash.  St Kilda Beach and Baths.  City of Port Philip, Art and Heritage Unit.  St Kilda 2001.
 Szego, Julie.  False start: the sea baths saga continues.  The Age. 24 July 2001.  p5.
 Wells, Lana,  Sunny Memories.  Australians at the Seaside.  Greenhouse Publications.  Richmond 1982. , pp 25, 26, 80, 81, 90 & 93.

External links
 St Kilda Sea Baths

Landmarks in Melbourne
Former public baths
1860 establishments in Australia
Public baths in Australia
Sea Baths
Sport in the City of Port Phillip
Buildings and structures in the City of Port Phillip